The 1999 King's Lynn and West Norfolk Borough Council election took place on 6 May 1999 to elect members of King's Lynn and West Norfolk Borough Council in England. This was on the same day as other local elections.

The whole council was up for election on new ward boundaries. The total number of seats was increased by 1.

Election result

|}

References

1999 English local elections
May 1999 events in the United Kingdom
1999
1990s in Norfolk